A total solar eclipse occurred on 28 April 1911. A solar eclipse occurs when the Moon passes between Earth and the Sun, thereby totally or partly obscuring the image of the Sun for a viewer on Earth. A total solar eclipse occurs when the  Moon's apparent diameter is larger than the Sun's, blocking all direct sunlight, turning day into darkness. Totality occurs in a narrow path across Earth's surface, with the partial solar eclipse visible over a surrounding region thousands of kilometres wide. Totality was visible from southeastern tip of Australia, Tonga, American Samoa and Cook Islands. Places west of International Date Line witnessed the eclipse on Saturday 29 April 1911.

Related eclipses

Solar eclipses 1910–1913

Saros 127

See also
HMAS Encounter (1902)#Operational history

Notes

References
 NASA graphics
 Report on the total solar eclipse of 1911, April 28 Tonga Island, South Pacific

1911 04 28
1911 in science
1911 04 28
April 1911 events